Gökçeören (also Gökçeviran) is a village in the district of İzmit, Kocaeli Province, Turkey.

References

Villages in İzmit District